Georgios Kornezos (born 23 February 1998) is a Greek professional footballer who plays as a centre-back for Super League club Lamia.

References

1998 births
Living people
Super League Greece players
Football League (Greece) players
Super League Greece 2 players
Gamma Ethniki players
Trikala F.C. players
A.E. Sparta P.A.E. players
Ionikos F.C. players
Ethnikos Piraeus F.C. players
AEK Athens F.C. players
AEK Athens F.C. B players
Asteras Vlachioti F.C. players
Volos N.F.C. players
PAS Lamia 1964 players
Association football defenders
Footballers from Athens
Greek footballers
Olympiacos F.C. players